The Cowboy Spring Formation is a geologic formation in southwestern New Mexico and southeastern Arizona. It preserves fossils dating back to the late Cretaceous period.

Description
The formation is primarily limestone cobble conglomerate. The massive conglomerate beds are separated by thinner beds of sandstone, shale, claystone, and tuff. The clasts in the conglomerate are of Cretaceous age and contain the foraminiferan Orbitolina and other common Cretaceous fossils. These are embedded in a red arkosic matrix. The sandstones are also mostly red and arkosic and the shale is mostly bright red. The formation interfingers with the underlying Mojado Formation, is overlain with angular unconformity by the Timberlake Formation, and has a total thickness of at least .

The formation was deposited in the Little Hat Top basin, which was produced by Laramide deformation on the southwest flank of the Hidalgo uplift.

History of investigation
The formation was first named by Zeller and Alper in 1965 for a single outcrop in the Animas Mountains. By 1970, it had been traced into southeastern Arizona Elston and Erb recommended merging the formation with the overlying Timberlake Formation due to lack of a clear lithological distinction, but this has not been universally accepted.

Footnotes

References
 
 
 
  

Cretaceous formations of New Mexico